Iowa Highway 59 (Iowa  59) was the designation of a state highway in Iowa that ran from the Missouri state line near Cincinnati to the Minnesota state line near Chester.  Iowa 59 was in existence for fourteen years—from 1920 to 1934.  Today, the route is related to the following highways:
Iowa Highway 5 from the Missouri state line near Cincinnati to Albia
Iowa Highway 137 from Albia to Oskaloosa
U.S. Highway 63 from Oskaloosa to the Minnesota state line near Chester

059
U.S. Route 63